This is a list of Canadian films which were released in the 1950s.

References

1950s
Canada
1950s in Canada